The 9th Annual Premios Juventud (Youth Awards) were broadcast by Univision on July 19, 2012.

Performers

Presenters

Miguel Cotto
Pamela Silva Conde
Alejandro Berry
Antonietta Collins
Amaria Rocco
Blanca Soto
Da Zoo
El Batallon
Giselle Blondet
Gustavo Galindo
J Alvarez
J Balvin
Jorge Ramos
Jose Ron
Mane de la Parra
Norka
Rodner Figueroa
Samo
Sherlyn
Vanessa de Roide

Special awards
Supernova: Fernando Colunga
Idol of Generations Award: Wisin & Yandel
The Best Dressed Award: Gerardo Ortiz & Belinda

Winners and nominees
Bold denotes winner not revealed during the ceremony.

Music

Television

Movies

Sports

Pop Culture

References

Premios Juventud
Premios
Premios
Premios
Premios
Premios Juventud
Premios Juventud
2010s in Miami